Tehranpars Metro Station is the eastern end of Tehran Metro Line 2, in Iran. It is located in the junction of Resalat Expressway and Hojar-ibn Ady. It is between Farhangsara Metro Station and Shahid Bagheri Metro Station.

This station has six escalators and two elevators.

References

Tehran Metro stations